Ahmet Oğuz (born 16 January 1993) is a Turkish professional footballer who plays as a midfielder for Konyaspor.

Career

Club career
Oğuz is a youth product of Gençlerbirliği and Hacettepe, and began his senior career with the latter in 2012. He moved back to Gençlerbirliği in 2014, where he made his debut in the Süper Lig. After 6 years with the club, Oğuz transferred to Kasımpaşa in 2020. He transferred to Sivasspor on 11 January 2022. He was a starter for Sivasspor in the 2021–22 Turkish Cup final, a 3–2 win over Kayserispor on 26 May 2022 that earned the club their first top flight trophy.

On 1 June 2022, Oğuz signed a two-year contract with Konyaspor.

International career
Oğuz was called up to the Turkey national football team for World Cup qualifiers against Croatia in September 2016.

Honours
Sivasspor
 Turkish Cup: 2021–22

References

External links

1993 births
People from Sorgun, Yozgat
Sportspeople from Yozgat
Living people
Turkish footballers
Association football defenders
Hacettepe S.K. footballers
Gençlerbirliği S.K. footballers
Kasımpaşa S.K. footballers
Sivasspor footballers
Konyaspor footballers
Süper Lig players
TFF First League players
TFF Third League players